Robert P. Dean (1909–1984) was a farmer, Merchant Marine, and Democratic politician born in Ridgely, Maryland, in Caroline County. He graduated from Washington College in 1931. Dean was a four-term Maryland State Senator representing the Upper Eastern Shore from Queen Anne's County starting in 1954 through 1967. Following a redistricting in 1967, Dean represented District 15 until his defeat in 1971.  serving on committees that included Judicial Proceedings, Finance, Banking and Insurance, Agriculture and Natural Resources, and Chesapeake Bay and its Tributaries. He was instrumental in the organization of Chesapeake College and Tuckahoe State Park in his district.

His brother was three-term Caroline County Commissioner Charles T. Dean, Sr.

Resources 
 Baltimore Sun, February 24, 1984 (accessed June 19, 2008).

References

1909 births
1984 deaths
People from Caroline County, Maryland
Washington College alumni
Democratic Party Maryland state senators
People from Queen Anne's County, Maryland
20th-century American politicians